Myddelton Square, the largest square in Central London's Clerkenwell, is a residential public garden square of the 1820s to 1840s, with playground, with many trees; its houses are built with exposed brickwork, Georgian style, with high-ceilinged ground and first-floor storeys. Two of its houses were obliterated and rebuilt, and two declared unsafe and rebuilt, in the London Blitz.

Architecture
It was laid out by William Chadwell Mylne. It still presents as a set of 73 large townhouses of its original style but many have been internally subdivided. The houses were firstly built by 13 building firms, then that chosen in World War II for 11A and 12A on the south side, plus another commissioned from the London Blitz-related reconstruction of two north-side houses. All are constructed in a Georgian style of "yellow" stock brick (often now slightly darkened) in Flemish bond and a white banded, stuccoed, to resemble stone-built, ground floor, and save for those stated as replacements, from 1822 to 1843. 

The square has St Mark's fronting the street on the west side of its garden.

All of the houses are Grade II listed, as is the church (protected and recognised in the initial, mainstream statutory category).

The square is named after Sir Hugh Myddelton (1560–1631), the founder of the New River Company, whose family sold the land on which it was built, drawing a profit by way of overseeing and granting building leases, meaning the upmarket builders shouldered the risk, when built up in later years.

Layout
Three main approach ways, the broadest being east, are added to by Myddleton Passage, which removed №s 3 and 4 (access to two apartment blocks and their landscaped grounds), but an earlier access to the same side was filled in to become new houses, in the same style, 11A and 12A.

Notable residents
The dramatist, actor and theatre manager, Thomas John Dibdin (1771–1841) was of the first residents, as to № 7 in 1826-27.

Events
№s 43–53 on the north side became rubble from bombing, mentioned above, on 11 January 1941. They were rebuilt by the New River Company in 1947 and 1948 which took government compensation, the frontages differ by having full-height brickwork, no ground floor stone-like dressings, of the others. №s 3 and 4 were demolished as lesser-damaged by the same bombing campaign.

Drama set
A BBC adaptation of Howards End, by EM Forster, in 2017, used a house as the London home of the central Schlegel family (suggestive of fictional "Wickham Place").

Further reading
Per the Historic England, statutory, listing:
The Squares of Islington; Cosh, M.; 1990; in Part I: Finsbury and Clerkenwell: pages 59-62.

References

Squares in the London Borough of Islington